Tajabad-e Olya (also Romanized as Tājābād-e ‘Olyā; also known as Tājābād and Tājābād-e Bālā) is a village in Rudbar Rural District, in the Central District of Rudbar-e Jonubi County, Kerman Province, Iran. At the 2006 census, its population was 235, in 49 families.

References 

Populated places in Rudbar-e Jonubi County